Wat Phleng is a district (amphoe) of Ratchaburi province, western Thailand.

History
In the past, the district was called Wat Pradu District because the office was in front of Wat Pradu, Wat Pradu canal. When the district office was moved to the present area, the district name was changed to be Maenam Om district. Later in 1914 the government moved the district office of Maenam Om to Tambon Pak Tho, which was more accessible as it was near the railway station. The old central area was made the Wat Phleng minor district (king amphoe). It was upgraded to a full district again on 17 July 1963.

Geography
Neighboring districts are (from the southwest clockwise) Pak Tho and Mueang Ratchaburi of Ratchaburi Province and Bang Khonthi and Amphawa of Samut Songkhram province.

The important water resource is the Khwae Om River, a branch of the Mae Klong River.

Administration

Central administration 
Wat Phleng is divided into three subdistricts (tambons), which are further subdivided into 28 administrative villages (mubans).

Local administration 
There is one subdistrict municipality (thesaban tambon) in the district:
 Wat Phleng consisting of parts of subdistricts Ko San Phra and Wat Phleng.

There are three subdistrict administrative organizations (SAO) in the district:
 Ko San Phra consisting of parts of subdistrict Ko San Phra.
 Chom Prathat consisting of subdistrict Chom Prathat.
 Wat Phleng consisting of parts of subdistrict Wat Phleng.

References

External links
amphoe.com
 Wat Phleng district history

Wat Phleng